The Christian Social and Economic Party (KSZGP) was a short-lived political party in Hungary.

History
Founded on 25 August 1919, already dissolved on 25 October 1919 and merged with the Christian National Party to form the Christian National Union Party.

References

Defunct political parties in Hungary
Catholic political parties
Christian political parties in Hungary